Ahan Prakash (born 20 August 2004) is an Indian footballer who plays as a goalkeeper for Indian Super League club Mumbai City.

Early life 
Born to a marketing couple and raised in a family with no significant sporting background, Ahan used to play cricket before being reportedly "forced" by his friends to give football a try.

In 2015, Ahan was selected by the Bengaluru Football Club for their Soccer School, playing both in the club's inter-school tournament and in the U-13 Youth League. In 2017 and 2018, he also represented Karnataka's State Team at the Sub-Junior National football tournament, captaining his side in the second edition.

Club career
Following some promising performances at a youth level, Ahan joined developmental team Indian Arrows in 2020.

On 10 January 2021, he made his Ileague debut, against Churchill Brothers, in a 5–2 loss. He went on to collect seven more appearances in the I-League as his club finished second to last in the table, maturing significantly as a goalkeeper and leaving his mark in the league's history book.

On 14 February 2021, he became the youngest recipient of the Hero of the Match, in the history of I-League, earning a clean sheet in a 1–0 win against Mohammedan. Later, he became the youngest captain in the history of I-League, leading his team to a 3–0 victory against NEROCA, on 6 March 2021.

International career 
After joining the national trial camp in Bhubaneswar in 2018, Ahan was selected on his second attempt, as he joined the Under-16 and Under-17 national football teams (under Coach Shuvendu Panda) for several different exposure tours, including the Future Champions Tournament in Johannesburg and a Tri-Nation Series in Dubai. During April and May of 2019, he also represented India's Under-15 Team in the Torneo delle Nazioni in Italy.

Career statistics

Club

References

Indian footballers
Association football goalkeepers
Indian Arrows players
I-League players
2004 births
Living people
Footballers from Bangalore